This page is a list of all the matches that Portugal national football team has played between 2020 and 2039.

2020s

2020

2021

2022

2023

Key: GS, Group stage; Euro 2020, UEFA Euro 2020; UEFA NL, UEFA Nations League; FWC Q, FIFA World Cup qualification.

Notes

References

External links
 Portugal: Fixtures and Results - FIFA.com
 Seleção A Jogos e Resultados FPF
 Resultados - Zero Zero
 Portugal - International Results

2020s in Portugal
Portugal national football team results